Paul Loeb (born August 26, 1935) is an American animal trainer and author of animal behavior and training books.

Background 
Paul Loeb was born on August 26, 1935 in the Williamsburg neighbourhood of Brooklyn.

Early career

Loeb's first practice was called Paul Loeb's Animal Analysis (1958–1962). It was an in-home problem-solving program. In 1962, he went further and created The Loeb Animal Institute Inc., which was an international animal behavior clinic. The institute was in existence until 1984.

For several years, Loeb was funded by a private grant. He lived on a 400-acre working farm in Amenia, New York, and then bought a house in Piermont on the Hudson River. Loeb studied the behavior of wildlife and farm animals and how they either avoided contact with human beings, or how they used contact with human beings to their advantage. This eventually led to the formulation of his Magic Touch theory of animal training which is described in.

Recognition

The Wall Street Journal compared Paul Loeb's work with animals to the work of B. F. Skinner: 
"Loeb illustrates practical approaches to physical needs as a means to psychological (read "behavioral") cures he is to the canine world what B.F. Skinner, the noted Harvard psychologist who devoted himself to the techniques of shaping behavior, was to the study of man."

In 1975, the Chicago Tribune wrote:
"His credits include more than 600 TV commercials, ranging from pet foods to men's underwear.  He also cured 8,000 family pets of such bad habits as biting, drooling, wetting, chewing, wandering, and intimidation."

Writing and media appearances

Loeb's first book Paul Loeb's Complete Book Of Dog Training (Prentice Hall), was selected as the best book of 1974 by the Dog Writer's Association of America as mentioned in.

Loeb's You Can Train Your Cat (Simon & Schuster 1979) was translated into many languages. This book was followed by Cathletics (Prentice Hall).

Early on, Loeb realized the need for a holistic approach, including diet and nutrition, when working with animals. Because of his working knowledge of diet and nutrition, Gaines, a division of General Foods, hired Loeb as a consultant in the early development of their Cycle dog food.  In addition to Nutrition And Your Dog (Pocket Books), which was originally titled Good Dog (G.P.Putnam's Sons), his work regarding diet, nutrition and proper exercise has been written up in the Wall Street Journal, Reading Eagle, Esquire Magazine, Glamour, Newsweek, Cosmopolitan, Family Circle, The Christian Science Monitor, The Charleston News and Courier, The New York Times, New York Post, New York Daily News, Chicago Sun-Times, Chicago Tribune, and the Philadelphia Inquirer.

Loeb also wrote a column for Parents magazine during the early eighties, dealing with topics concerning pet behaviour and having pets in a household with children.

Loeb appeared on his first national  talk show, the Mike Douglas show, in 1973,  Loeb was also a guest on Johnny Carson's Tonight Show in 1975, ABC's Good Morning America in 1979, Dateline NBC in 1998, and WNEW Midday in 1977.

Books

References

American animal care and training writers
American male non-fiction writers
Animal trainers
Dog trainers
1935 births
Living people